Mona Achache (born 18 March 1981) is a French-Moroccan film director, actress and screenwriter.

Career

Following a literary and theatrical education Mona Achache becomes an assistant director followed by screenwriting for fictional and documentary films. Becoming a mother at the age of 20, she produced a documentary film about birth in 2002.

In late 2022, she shot the docudrama Little Girl Blue, with Marion Cotillard portraying Achache's mother. Achache wrote, directed and acted in the film.

Personal life
In the early 2000s Achache was in a relationship with director Christophe Ruggia. She later revealed that their relationship ended after he confessed to her that he had fallen in love with, and subsequently inappropriately touched, actress Adèle Haenel, who was at that time underage, corroborating Haenel's account of sexual abuse at the hands of Ruggia.

Filmography

References

External links
 

1981 births
Living people
French film actresses
French film directors
French people of Moroccan descent
21st-century French actresses
French women film directors
French women screenwriters
French screenwriters
Place of birth missing (living people)